Narciso “Tanque” Zazueta is a retired Mexican footballer who played in both the United States and Mexico.

Zazueta played for Hermisillo Seris, a third division club in Mexico. In 1992, he joined the Tucson Amigos halfway through the 1992 United States Interregional Soccer League season. The Amigos were 1–6 at the time, but the addition of Zazueta and John Olu–Molomo led to the Amigos making the playoffs and going to the championship game where they lost to the Palo Alto Firebirds. Zazueta was All League. Zazueta continued to play for the Amigos until 1994, driving up from his home in Hermisillo, Mexico for practice and games. In July 1994, he joined an unknown team in the Mexican Second Division. He played for Inter Tijuana from 1996 to 1997 in Primera División A, Group II.

References

Living people
1968 births
Footballers from Sinaloa
Sportspeople from Culiacán
Mexican footballers
Tucson Amigos players
USISL players
Association football defenders
Association football forwards